Cyrestis cassander is an Indomalayan  butterfly of the family Nymphalidae. It is endemic to the Philippines.

Subspecies
Cyrestis cassander cassander C.& R.Felder, 1863 (Batanes,  Luzon, Marinduque, Mindoro)
Cyrestis cassander dacebalus Fruhstorfer, 1912 (Balabac, Camotes, Dinagat, Guimaras, Leyte, Samar)
Cyrestis cassander orchomenus Fruhstorfer, 1912 (Basilan, Mindanao)
Cyrestis cassander thessa Fruhstorfer, 1889 (Balabac, Calamian group, Palawan)

Taxonomy
The species is often listed as C. p. cassander, a subspecies of Cyrestis paulinus.

References

External links
Bionames

Cyrestinae
Butterflies described in 1863
Endemic fauna of the Philippines
Butterflies of Asia
Taxa named by Baron Cajetan von Felder
Taxa named by Rudolf Felder